Auchbreck (meaning the speckled field) is a village in Moray, Scotland.

Villages in Moray